Renzo Valentín Umeres (born 16 June 2003) is an Argentine professional footballer who plays as an attacking midfielder for San Martin (M), on loan from Villa Dálmine.

Career
Umeres started his senior career in Primera B Nacional with Villa Dálmine at the age of seventeen. He was promoted into Felipe De la Riva's first-team squad ahead of the 2020 campaign, with the player subsequently making his professional debut on matchday one away to eventual champions Sarmiento on 28 November 2020; he replaced Tomás Garro with twelve minutes remaining of a goalless draw. His first start arrived on 20 December at home against Atlético de Rafaela, which preceded his first goal coming on 3 January 2021 versus Gimnasia y Esgrima away from home. He finished the season with eight appearances.

On 13 February 2021, Umeres completed a loan move to Primera División side Talleres; on a deal lasting until the end of the year, with La T holding a purchase option.
On 2023, Valentín arrives to San Martin (M), playing in Torneo Federal A.

Career statistics
.

Notes

References

External links

2003 births
Living people
Place of birth missing (living people)
Argentine footballers
Association football midfielders
Primera Nacional players
Villa Dálmine footballers
Talleres de Córdoba footballers